Landser was a German neo-Nazi rock band. Landser is an old-fashioned German colloquialism for a low-ranking soldier. The band, who are outlawed in Germany, were previously called  (Final Solution), and were founded by members of the neo-Nazi group  (The Vandals – Aryan Germanic Combat Association), which was founded in 1982 in the former German Democratic Republic.

They performed only one concert that was open to the public, and did so wearing masks. However, they held several private concerts in restaurants in Berlin, Germany. Landser had their CDs manufactured abroad, mainly in the United States, Canada and Eastern Europe. The music is distributed online, by underground dealers through peer-to-peer networks or purchased from music labels in the United States and in some European countries where their music is legal (mostly in Eastern Europe and the United Kingdom).

History 
Michael Reneger, Landser's singer and guitarist, started a gang of neo-Nazi rockers called Vandalen in East Berlin in 1982. The Vandalen advocated a return to Odinism.

In 1991, the band that would become Landser were formed by Soren B (vocals and guitar), Andreas L (bass) and Horst S (drums). This proto-Landser were non-political and played covers of German and English songs. Regener replaced Soren in early 1992 and named the group Endlosung, then Landser.

Shortly after its release, Landser played their only public concert, wearing masks. The song "Rudolf Hess" from  glorifies Nazi Rudolf Hess as a martyr and, in  Michael Regener, the band's leader, pays tribute to his grandfather, who was a Waffen-SS officer. The track  ("Sold and Betrayed") from  compares life in East Germany, where Regener was born, to life in modern Germany. In it, he says that he "can still see the snipers lurking in the watchtowers" and at the end, he exclaims that he has been "sold out and betrayed by the fucking democrats".

Most of their songs espouse an aggressively nationalist perspective of the world and are highly critical of the Federal Republic of Germany, its surveillance and censorship agencies (i.e. the ), liberalism and the Left. A number of songs speak against communists, pedophiles and homosexuals, as well as ethnic minorities in Germany, such as the Poles, Jews, Russians, Gypsies, Turks, Vietnamese, blacks and Czechs but also against refugees. Many songs are decidedly racist against all non-whites. Some of their songs are non-political and inspired by German drinking songs. Others praise German icons such as Frederick the Great or take an anti-drug stance.

Legal action 
In Germany, the band has been deemed a criminal organization and its three members were fined and ordered to perform community service. The court also found all three men guilty of "incitement of the masses" and "spreading hate propaganda" in addition to "forming a criminal organisation".

Bassist Andre Möhricke and drummer Christian Wenndorff both received a year and nine months’ probation after the judge said they helped investigators and expressed remorse; the band's leader, Michael Regener was sentenced to more than three years in prison. This was the first time a band had been declared illegal in Germany and its members jailed. On 10 March 2005, the German Federal Court of Justice, Germany's highest court, rejected Regener's appeal of his sentence.

Owing to Möhricke and Wenndorff making long statements to the police and courts to receive shorter sentences, Michael Regener dissolved the band forever. He stated his former friends and band members had "liberty expensively bought, at the price of honour!"

All Landser albums were censored via a process called indexed. As a result of the indexing, two compilation albums, "Rock gegen ZOG" and "Tanzorchester Immervoll", were released containing all the songs that did not have forbidden lyrics.

Regener was still producing CDs while waiting for his appeal. After the forced breakup of Landser, Regener founded a new band in 2004, Die Lunikoff Verschwörung (The Lunikoff conspiracy). They have made several CDs, including 2004's Die Rückkehr des Unbegreiflichen, Amalek Vol. 1 & 2, and 2005's Niemals auf Knien. The lyrics of these CDs were vetted by lawyers to make them not actionable according to German law. On October 21, 2006, approximately 750 neo-Nazis launched a protest outside the jail where Regener was being held, demanding his release.

In January 2007, under German law because Michael Regener had already served two-thirds of his jail sentence his lawyers filed for probation. The justice sentencing court of Berlin agreed with probation and suspended the remaining time. The Federal prosecutors office took the case to the court of appeal against the Berlin decision and on 19 March 2007, the original sentence was upheld. He was released early March 2008.

Discography 
All these albums are indexed, but used copies are still available from other countries and they circulate on peer-to-peer sites.

 Das Reich kommt wieder (1992)
 Republik der Strolche (1995)
 Rock gegen Oben (1997)
 Ran an den Feind (2000)
 Endlösung - Final Solution (2001, compilation of pre-Landser demos recorded when the band were still calling themselves Endlösung)
 Rock gegen ZOG - hepp-hepp! ...und noch einmal (2002, compilation)
 Tanzorchester Immervoll... jetzt erst recht (2002, compilation)

Personnel

Final lineup 
 Michael Regener – vocals, guitar (1992–2003)
 André Möhricke – bass (1995–2003)
 Christian Wenndorff – drums (1997–2003)

Past members 
 Sören B. – vocals, guitar (1991–1992)
 Andreas L. – bass (1991–1995)
 Horst S. – drums (1991–1997)

See also
 Combat 18
 Blood and Honour
 List of neo-Nazi bands

References

German musical groups
Neo-Nazi musical groups
Musical groups established in 1991
Musical groups disestablished in 2003
1991 establishments in Germany